Fiorenzo Manganiello (August 6, 1991) is an Italian banker and expert in field of blockchain technologies who was awarded as Blockchain Expert Switzerland for 2018 by Acquisition International.

Early life and education 
Manganiello grew up in Italy. He studied financial economics at the LUISS Business School. He also attended The London School of Economics and Political Science (LSE) and the IMD Business School.

Career 
In 2013, Manganiello's started his career as a Quantitative Analyst in the hedge fund industry.  In Sep 2018 he joined the Blockcloud company as a position of Advisory Board Member together with the nobel prize winner in economics Oliver Hart. Manganiello also becomes the first vice president of the Banque Profil de Gestion in Aug 2016. In Dec 2019, Manganiello becomes Ambassador of the Global Blockchain Business Council, an industry association for the blockchain technology ecosystem. In 2018 he becomes board member of the venture capital fund LIAN Group.

From 2018 he has been a professor at Geneva Business School in the fields of venture capital and blockchain. Manganiello has received many awards, in 2017 he received best investment banking team for Switzerland at Leaders League award. In June 2018 he received Blockchain Expert of the Year Switzerland at the Acquisition International Leading Awards.

Art collection
Manganiello’s private collection is composed of NFTs and painting of not only renowned artists such as Oli Epp, Austin Lee and Alexander Gardner, but also of young emergent contemporary artists as Chloé Wise and Marja Djordjevic. The collection represents the vanguard of a burgeoning movement that explores the elusive boundary between the digital and physical worlds.

Charity work 
Manganiello established the LIAN Foundation in 2019, a non-profit organization that contributes to a number of projects in the charitable, educational and art fields, working closely with international organizations such as the United Nations and the Red Cross.

LIAN Foundation sponsored multiple scholarships and awards for emerging artists and creators.

References 

1991 births
Living people
Blockchain art